Lars Ove Lundby (born 21 September 1953) is a retired Swedish boxer who competed at the 1972 and 1976 Summer Olympics. Lundy benefited from a very favorable draw in the 1976 Olympic tournament, getting two byes and a walkover win.  Without having to compete against anyone, he advanced into the quarterfinals.  In his opening bout, he lost to Simion Cutov of Romania by unanimous decision.

References

1953 births
Living people
Swedish male boxers
Olympic boxers of Sweden
Boxers at the 1972 Summer Olympics
Boxers at the 1976 Summer Olympics
Sportspeople from Stockholm
Bantamweight boxers
20th-century Swedish people